Downtown North Historic District may refer to:

Bridgeport Downtown North Historic District, Bridgeport, Connecticut, listed on the National Register of Historic Places (NRHP)
 Downtown North Historic District (Hartford, Connecticut), NRHP-listed
 Downtown North Historic District (Winston-Salem, North Carolina), NRHP-listed in Forsyth County